The Bugatti Type 51 series succeeded the famous Type 35 as Bugatti's premier racing car for the 1930s. The main distinction is that it uses a twin cam engine. Unlike the dominant Type 35s of the prior decade, the Type 51 (and later Type 53, Type 54, and Type 59) were unable to compete with the government-supported German and Italian offerings.

Type 51
The first Type 51 went into production in 1931 with Ettore Bugatti's son Jean Bugatti taking more responsibility.  Its engine was a 160 hp (119 kW) twin overhead cam evolution of the supercharged 2.3 L (2262 cc/138 in³) single overhead cam straight-8 found in the Type 35B. Inspiration for this new design thinking came from two Miller racing cars that Jean Bugatti was testing for power output. The Bugatti Type 51 is sometimes referred to as "the Millerhead".   

A victory in the 1931 French Grand Prix was a good start for the type, and it notably won the 1933 Monaco Grand Prix with Achille Varzi beating Tazio Nuvolari in a Homeric struggle against the new challenge of the Alfa Romeo 8C. 

About 40 examples of the Type 51 and 51A were produced.  The Type 51 is visually very similar to the Type 35. The obvious external differences of a Type 51 are: the supercharger blow-off outlet is lower the bonnet in the louvered section;  one piece cast wheels instead of bolted on rims; twin fuel caps behind the driver and finally the magneto being off-set to the left on the dash.  However many Type 35 cars have been fitted with later wheels, so that is not a reliable signal.

One Type 51 would be modified to be a sports car known as the Bugatti Type 51 Dubos Coupe.

Type 54

Grand Prix car of 1931, fitted with a twin overhead-cam 4.9-liter engine delivering 300 hp (223 kW). Four or five were built.
Chassis number 54201 was the first type 54 built and was the works car for Achille Varzi, factory number plate 4311-NV1

Type 59

The final Bugatti race car of the 1930s was the Type 59 of 1934.  It used an enlarged 3.3 L (3257 cc/198 in³) version of the straight-eight Type 57's engine sitting in a modified Type 54 chassis.  The engine was lowered for a better center of gravity, and the frame was lightened with a number of holes drilled in the chassis.  The signature piano wire wheels used splines between the brake drum and rim, and relied on the radial spokes to handle cornering loads.  250 hp (186 kW) was on tap, and eight were made.

On 5 September 2020 a Bugatti T59, built in 1934, was auctioned for 8,5 million pound by Gooding & Company. The car had been used by the Bugatti racing team in 1934-1935 and being driven by René Dreyfus it won the Belgian Grand Prix in 1934. It was later rebuilt as a sportscar by Bugatti and sold to King Leopold III of Belgium

See also

 Bugatti Type 53 – Four wheel drive Type 51 racer
 Bugatti Type 57 – luxury 1930s car

References

External links

 Bugatti Trust Type 53 article

51
Grand Prix cars
24 Hours of Le Mans race cars